The discography of AZ, an American rapper, consists of nine studio albums, one collaborative album, 11 compilation albums and 15 singles.

Albums

Studio albums

Collaboration albums

Compilation albums
 S.O.S.A. (Save Our Streets AZ) (2000)
 Decade 1994–2004 (2004)
 Final Call (The Lost Tapes) (2008)
 Anthology (B-Sides & Unreleased) (2008)
 Doe or Die: 15th Anniversary (2010)
 Greatest Hits, Vol. 1 (2017)
 Lost & Found (2019)

Mixtapes
 The Memphis Sessions: The Remix-Tape (2007)
 N.4.L. (Niggaz 4 Life) (Hosted by DJ Absolut) (2008)
 G.O.D. (Gold, Oil & Diamonds) (2009)
 L.O.D.B (Last of a Dying Breed) (Hosted by AZ and DJ Mr. FX) (2013)
 L.O.D.B II (Last of a Dying Breed) (Hosted by AZ and DJ Mr. FX) (2013)
 Legacy (Hosted by DJ Doo Wop) (2019)

Singles

Guest appearances

Notes

References

Hip hop discographies
Discographies of American artists